Still Life of Fruit, Dead Birds, and a Monkey is a painting by the Dutch artist Clara Peeters, . The painting is in a private collection.

Painting 
Fruit, Dead Birds, and a Monkey has a:

Provenance 
The early history of the painting is not known. As of 1953, it was held by the Mullers. It was auctioned at Sotheby's to Miss Belleri on July 6, 1966. It has since been auctioned again at Sotheby's (December 11, 1991) and for 103,250 pounds at Christie's (April 24, 2009).

Legacy 
A History of Pictures for Children by David Hockney and Martin Gayford discusses the painting in the "Light and Shadows" chapter.

References 

Clara Peeters
Still life paintings
Food and drink paintings
17th-century paintings